Dolores Castro Varela (12 April 1923 – 30 March 2022) was a Mexican poet, narrator, essayist and literary critic.

Biography 
Castro was a professor of literature at institutions such as the National Autonomous University of Mexico, Universidad Iberoamericana and Escuela de Periodismo Carlos Septién García. She was the founder of Radio UNAM and producer of radio programs. She also hosted the program Poetas de México on Canal 11 with Alejandro Avilés. She collaborated in the direction of Cultural Diffusion of the University. She served as editor-in-chief and contributor to Barcos de Papel. She was a member of the editorial board of Summa Bibliographical. Fuensanta, The Word and The Man, Level, Poetry of America, Bibliographic Sum, and Magazine of the UIA. HIS poems of hers What is lived? She won the National Prize for Poetry of Mazatlan in 1980. She won the National Prize for Sciences and Arts in Literature and Linguistics in 2014. In 2008, the INBA paid her a tribute for her 85 years of life. In 2014, the INBA paid tribute to her with the editorial presentation Dolores Castro, 90 years old: word and time.

Castro has been for decades the teacher of many generations of poets. She was also part of the group Eight Mexican Poets, made up of Alejandro Avilés, Roberto Cabral del Hoyo, Javier Peñalosa, Honorato Magaloni Duarte, Efrén Hernández, Octavio Novaro and Rosario Castellanos.

Bibliography 
Poems
El corazón transfigurado, 1949
Dos nocturnos, 1952
Siete poemas, 1952
La tierra está sonando, 1959
Cantares de vela, 1960
Soles, 1977
Qué es lo vivido, 1980
Las palabras, 1990
Poemas inéditos, 1990
No es el amor el vuelo, 1992
Tornasol, 1997
Sonar en el silencio, 2000
Oleajes, 2003
Íntimos huéspedes, 2004
Algo le duele al aire, 2011
Viento quebrado, poesía reunida, 2011
El corazón transfigurado/The Transfigured Heart, 2013
Sombra domesticada, 2013
Pozo de Luz, Poetazos, 2013
Algo le duele al aire/ Something Pains the Wind, 2015

Novel
 La ciudad y el viento, 1962

Essay
Dimensión de la lengua en su función creativa, emotiva y esencial, 1989

Anthologies
Obras completas, 1991
Antología poética en francés, 2003
A mitad de un suspiro, 2008
La vida perdurable, antología poética

References

1923 births
2022 deaths
Mexican women poets
Mexican women essayists
Mexican literary critics
People from Aguascalientes City
20th-century Mexican women writers
21st-century Mexican women writers
Writers from Aguascalientes
Complutense University of Madrid alumni
National Autonomous University of Mexico alumni